Alain Goosen (born 26 January 1948) is a French diver. He competed at the 1972 Summer Olympics and the 1976 Summer Olympics.

References

1948 births
Living people
French male divers
Olympic divers of France
Divers at the 1972 Summer Olympics
Divers at the 1976 Summer Olympics
Place of birth missing (living people)
20th-century French people